There are four lists of state highways in Maryland shorter than one mile split by number ranges:
 List of state highways in Maryland shorter than one mile (2–699)
 List of state highways in Maryland shorter than one mile (700–799)
 List of state highways in Maryland shorter than one mile (800–899)
 List of state highways in Maryland shorter than one mile (900–999)

State highways in Maryland shorter than one mile
State highways shorter than one mile
Maryland